Ice is a novel by British writer Anna Kavan, published in 1967. Ice was Kavan's last work to be published before her death, the first to land her mainstream success, and remains her best-known work. Generally regarded as genre-defying, it has been labelled a work of science fiction, Nouveau roman, and slipstream fiction.

Background 
Kavan completed an early draft of Ice in March 1964. It was first submitted to Weidenfeld & Nicolson by Francis King, but was rejected. It was then accepted by Peter Owen, though he expressed doubts about the manuscript, citing a deficiency of character and narrative. Kavan defended the work, writing that "it is not meant to be realistic writing. It's a sort of present day fable..." She "saw the story as one of those recurring dreams ... which at times become nightmare. This dreamlike atmosphere is the essence of the [novel]." Early readers described the novel as a cross between Kafka and The Avengers, which Kavan felt was an apt description.

Over the next six months, the manuscript went through extensive revisions. Owen accepted the manuscript again, and convinced Kavan to change the title from The Ice World to simply Ice.

Like most of Kavan's novels, Ice contains autobiographical elements that are fictionalized, but for this novel in particular are used in a surrealistic sense: Kavan's extensive travelling, her marriage to artist Stuart Edmonds, and her unhappy childhood are important inspirations for elements of the novel. The imagery of ice was inspired by Kavan's time in New Zealand, when she was not far from Antarctica. The Madagascan Indris, an element which reoccurs throughout the story, came to Kavan after watching a David Attenborough nature documentary.

Plot outline 
Ice is set during an apocalypse in which a massive, monolithic ice shelf, caused by nuclear war, is engulfing the earth. The male protagonist, and narrator of the story, spends the narrative feverishly pursuing a young, nameless woman, and contemplating the overwhelming but conflicting feelings he has for her, that slowly end up being intruded by the worsening atmosphere of the setting. Initially he must negotiate the presence of the woman's husband and later he faces more serious opposition from the  Warden who seeks to keep her under his control. Christopher Priest, in his introduction to the novel, writes that the book is "virtually plotless" and "told in scenes of happenstance and coincidence."

Style and themes 
Ice has been described as dreamlike, cryptic, unsettling, and hallucinogenic. There are no named characters, and the plot and geography of the story may seem arbitrary by the standards of realistic or popular fiction. The narrative is regularly interrupted by dreams and hallucinations, and it is suggested that the narrator is delusional.

Attention has been paid to the recurring imagery of coldness and encroaching ice, which is commonly associated with Kavan's struggles with heroin addiction and mental illness. Other critics argue that the symbolism resists straightforward biographical interpretations.

The novel's preoccupations with violent sexuality and female agency have invited feminist interpretations.

Reception 
Ice was Kavan's first major literary success. After the publication of the novel, she was profiled in the September 1967 edition of Nova, alongside Jean Rhys. Brian Aldiss, whose work Kavan admired, praised it as the best science fiction novel of 1967. In 1968, a week after Kavan's death, Doubleday published Ice in the United States on the advice of Aldiss.

Notes

References 

1967 British novels
1967 science fiction novels
Apocalyptic novels
Fiction with unreliable narrators
Peter Owen Publishers books